Agarista is a genus of moths in the family Noctuidae. The genus was erected by William Elford Leach in 1814..

Species
 Agarista agricola - Joseph's coat moth Donovan, 1805
 Syn. Agarista picta
 Agarista agricola biformis Butler, 1884
 Agarista agricola timorensis Rothschild, 1896
 Agarista agricola daemonis Butler, 1876
 Agarista hesperoides Walker, 1856

References

Agaristinae
Noctuoidea genera